Sveti Primož may refer to several places in Slovenia: 

Primož pri Ljubnem, a settlement in the Municipality of Ljubno, known as Sveti Primož until 1955
Primož pri Šentjurju, a settlement in the Municipality of Šentjur, known as Sveti Primož until 1955
Primož, Sevnica, a settlement in the Municipality of Sevnica, known as Sveti Primož until 1955
Sveti Primož na Pohorju, a settlement in the Municipality of Vuzenica
Sveti Primož nad Muto, a settlement in the Municipality of Muta